Miracle of the White Stallions is a 1963 American adventure war film released by Walt Disney starring Robert Taylor (playing Alois Podhajsky), Lilli Palmer,  and Eddie Albert. It is the story of the evacuation of the Lipizzaner horses from the Spanish Riding School in Vienna during World War II. Major parts of the movie were shot at the Hermesvilla palace in the Lainzer Tiergarten of Vienna, a former hunting area for the Habsburg nobility.  The music for the soundtrack was based on the first movement of Franz Schubert's Marche Militaire no 1, D733.

Plot
In 1945 World War II Austria, Col. Alois Podhajsky sets out to protect his beloved Lipizzaner stallions - purebred white show horses with centuries of tradition - from starving refugees and the advancing Soviet Army, which might also view them as a food source. Hoping to surrender them into safekeeping, he seeks out U.S. General George S. Patton, a noted horse fancier.

Cast

Robert Taylor - Col. Alois Podhajsky
Lilli Palmer  	- Vedena Podhajsky
Curd Jürgens  	- Gen. Tellheim
Eddie Albert  	- Rider Otto
James Franciscus  	- Maj. Hoffman
John Larch  	- Gen. George S. Patton
Brigitte Horney  	- Countess Arco-Valley
Philip Abbott  	- Col. Reed
Douglas Fowley  	- U.S. General
Charles Régnier  	- SS-Brigadeführer Streicher
Fritz Wepper  	- Rider Hans
Guenther Haenel  	- Groom Sascha
Hans Habietinek  	- Innkeeper Hager
Philo Hauser  	- Dispatcher
Michael Janisch - Refugee Leader
Max Haufler  	- Engineer
Robert Dietl  	- German MP Captain
Erik Schumann  	- German Capt. Danhoff
Helmuth Janatsch  	- Intruder
Michael Tellering 	- Stryker's Adjutant
James Dobson - Southern GI

Comic book adaption
 Gold Key: Miracle of the White Stallions (June 1963)

Notes

See also
List of American films of 1963

References

External links
 
 
 
 

1963 films
Films about horses
Walt Disney Pictures films
1960s war drama films
American World War II films
1960s adventure drama films
Spanish Riding School
Films directed by Arthur Hiller
Films produced by Walt Disney
Films set in 1945
Films set in 1955
Films set in Vienna
Films shot in Vienna
Films scored by Paul Smith (film and television composer)
American war drama films
Films adapted into comics
1963 drama films
1960s English-language films
1960s American films